Povarskaya Street (known from 1924–1991 as Vorovsky Street (улица Воровского), is a radial street in the center of Moscow, Russia, connecting Arbat Square on Boulevard Ring with Kudrinskaya Square on the Garden Ring. It is known informally as Moscow's Embassy Row, and is home to the finest mansions built in the 1890s and 1900s. Povarskaya Street also houses the Supreme Court of Russia and the Gnessin State Musical College.

Most of Povarskaya Street lies in the Arbat District; its northern side near Kudrinskaya Square is administered by the Presnensky District.

History
Povarskaya Street follows the track of an ancient road from Moscow to Volokolamsk. In the 1570s Ivan Grozny allocated the street to oprichnina (private royal domain) and the street was taken over by his associates. In the 17th century, however, its upper-class population was diluted by lower classes. The street owes its name to cooks (povara) of the 17th century Muscovite court. Nearby lanes are also named after various court servants: bakers (Khlebny Lane), tablecloth weavers (Skatertny Lane), etc.

When Peter I established his new capital city in Saint Petersburg, this court sloboda depopulated, and the street was re-settled by nobles again, housing families including Gagarin, Golitsyn, Suvorov and the court of Peter's sister, princess Natalya Alexeevna (1673–1716). The street has retained its upper-class, exclusive role since that time. It is unusually quiet for downtown Moscow - with the exception of music from the Gnesin Institute windows, there are no retail shops, no office blocks and no public transport.

In the late 1890s, real estate developer Jacob Reck consolidated two blocks in the middle of Povarskaya and commissioned prestigious Moscow architects Lev Kekushev and Roman Klein to design exclusive single-family mansions. These buildings, occupied by foreign embassies, are a showcase of Moscow Art Nouveau style.

Notable buildings

 5 - Church of Saint Simeon Stylites
 7 - Embassy of Norway by Ivan Kuznetsov and Adolph Seligson
 9 - Embassy of Cyprus by Ivan Kuznetsov
 13,15 - Supreme Court of Russia
 21 - House of Hungarian Culture
 23,25 - Gagarin house by Domenico Giliardi (World Literature Museum)
 24 - Art Nouveau building that housed the first Embassy of Lithuania (1920–1940)
 30 - Shuvalov house by Alexander Kaminsky
 33 - Cinema Actors' Theater by Victor Vesnin and Alexander Vesnin, 1931
 32,34,36 - Gnessin State Musical College
 40 - Embassy of Grenada to the Russian Federation
 42 - Ponizovsky house by Lev Kekushev (Embassy of Afghanistan)
 44 - Mindovsky house by Lev Kekushev (Embassy of New Zealand)
 46 - Schlossberg house by Adolph Seligson
 50 - Svyatopolk house by Pyotr Boytsov
 52 - Dolgorukov estate; the basis of the "Rostov Estate" in Tolstoy's War and Peace

Public transport access
 Arbatskaya (Arbatsko-Pokrovskaya Line) - beginning
 Barrikadnaya - end

Streets in Moscow
Arbat District